Teach Me Tonight is a popular song that has become a jazz standard. The music was written by Gene De Paul, the lyrics by Sammy Cahn. The song was published in 1953.

Early recordings
Five versions charted in 1954 and 1955: 
Janet Brace was apparently first, making the Billboard chart on October 23, 1954, and eventually reaching No. 23. First recording from 1953
Jo Stafford — No. 15 in 1954
Dinah Washington — a No. 4 R&B/Hip-Hop Songs hit in 1954, inducted into the Grammy Hall of Fame in 1999
Helen Grayco — No. 29 in 1954 
The DeCastro Sisters ("It's Love" / "Teach Me Tonight", Abbott Record Co. 3001) — No. 2 in 1955. In addition, a 1959, re-recording entitled, "Teach Me Tonight Cha Cha" went to No. 76 on the Hot 100.

Other recordings
In 1982, Al Jarreau included his version on "Breakin' Away" In the US, this version went to No. 70 on the Hot 100 and No. 51 on the Hot Soul Singles chart. In addition, it went to No.19 on the Adult Contemporary chart.
A cover of the recording by Stevie Wonder and Levi Stubbs (with backing vocals by Stubbs' group the Four Tops) appears on Wonder's 1965 album Up-Tight.
A 2020 version appears on James Taylor's American Standards album.

References

External links
"Teach Me Tonight" at jazzstandards.com
6 versions of "Teach Me Tonight",

Songs with music by Gene de Paul
Songs with lyrics by Sammy Cahn
1953 songs
The DeCastro Sisters songs
Abbott Records singles
Jo Stafford songs
Dinah Washington songs
Helen Grayco songs